Albert "Albie" Axelrod (February 12, 1921 – February 24, 2004) was an American foil fencer.

He was a five-time Olympian for the US, won a bronze medal at the 1960 Olympics, and was the only American men's foil fencer to reach the finals at the world championships until Gerek Meinhardt won a bronze medal in the 2010 World Fencing Championships.

Fencing career

High school

Axelrod was Jewish, the son of Russian Jewish immigrants who had fled the pogroms, grew up in the Bronx.  A heart murmur kept Axelrod from participating in most sports, so his mother encouraged him to learn fencing at Stuyvesant High School in New York City.  After graduation in 1938, he studied with 1920 Olympic champion Giorgio Santelli and won amateur titles as a member of the Salle Santelli club.

College
Axelrod served in the US Navy in World War II, and then attended the City College of New York. His college team reached the National Team Foil Championships in 1948, the same year he was U.S. Intercollegiate Fencing Association and NCAA Champion.

US Championships and rankings
Axelrod was ranked # 1 in the United States in 1955, 1958, 1960, and 1970. He was in the top ten 22 times in the years 1942 to 1970. He was a five-time winner of the National Foil Team Championship (1940, 1950, 1952, 1954, and 1958), and his team won the National Three-Weapon team crown five times (1949, 1952, 1954, 1962, and 1963).

World Championships
He was a member of the United States World Championship team four times. His best placing was fifth, in 1958.

Olympics
Axelrod was on five U.S. Olympic Teams (1952–68). He won the bronze medal in Individual Foil competition at the 1960 Summer Olympics. The entire USA Foil Fencing Team at the 1956 Olympics was Jewish, with the other Jewish fencers being Daniel Bukantz, Harold Goldsmith, Nathaniel Lubell, and Byron Krieger.

Pan American Games
He was also a member of four U.S. Pan American Games teams. He won three team gold medals, one team silver, and four individual silvers in Foil.

Maccabiah Games
Axelrod, who was Jewish, won many gold and silver medals in foil and sabre in his six appearances at the World Maccabiah Games in Israel, including the 1957 Maccabiah Games (where he won the gold medal in foil), the 1961 Maccabiah Games (in which he won a gold medal in individual foil, and a gold medal in team foil with Olympic teammate Byron Krieger), the 1965 Maccabiah Games in foil, and the 1969 Maccabiah Games.

Approach to fencing
"I have no purely defensive moves", Axelrod told The New York Times in 1966. "Everyone attributes my skill to the fact that I'm a physical freak, that I have tremendously fast reflexes. I'm not a natural athlete. When it comes to fencing, I'm completely synthetic. I had to practice arduously and break down into tiny components every move I make.''

Editor
Axelrod was the Editor of "American Fencing" magazine (1986–90).

Hall of Fame inductions
Axelrod was inducted into the International Jewish Sports Hall of Fame in 1973.

He was inducted into the USFA Hall of Fame in 1974.

Miscellaneous
Axelrod worked as an electrical engineer for the Grumman Corporation.

See also
List of select Jewish fencers

References

External links
Pan Am Game results
Obituary in "The Independent," 2004
Obituary in "The Sunday Times," 2004

1921 births
2004 deaths
American male foil fencers
Fencers at the 1952 Summer Olympics
Fencers at the 1956 Summer Olympics
Fencers at the 1960 Summer Olympics
Fencers at the 1964 Summer Olympics
Fencers at the 1968 Summer Olympics
CCNY Beavers fencers
Jewish American sportspeople
Jewish male foil fencers
Jewish male sabre fencers
Olympic bronze medalists for the United States in fencing
Stuyvesant High School alumni
United States Navy sailors
International Jewish Sports Hall of Fame inductees
Medalists at the 1960 Summer Olympics
Sportspeople from the Bronx
American people of Russian-Jewish descent
United States Navy personnel of World War II
Competitors at the 1957 Maccabiah Games
Competitors at the 1961 Maccabiah Games
Competitors at the 1965 Maccabiah Games
Competitors at the 1969 Maccabiah Games
Maccabiah Games gold medalists for the United States
Maccabiah Games silver medalists for the United States
Maccabiah Games medalists in fencing
Pan American Games gold medalists for the United States
Pan American Games silver medalists for the United States
Pan American Games medalists in fencing
Fencers at the 1955 Pan American Games
Fencers at the 1959 Pan American Games
Fencers at the 1963 Pan American Games
Fencers at the 1967 Pan American Games
Medalists at the 1963 Pan American Games
20th-century American Jews
21st-century American Jews